Chymases (mast cell protease 1, skeletal muscle protease, skin chymotryptic proteinase, mast cell serine proteinase, skeletal muscle protease) are a family of serine proteases found primarily in mast cells, though also present in basophil granulocytes (e.g. alpha chymase mcpt8). Recently, Derakhshan et al. reported that a specific mast cell population  expressed  trascripts for Mcpt8. They show broad peptidolytic activity and are involved in a variety of functions.  For example, chymases are released by connective tissue-type mast cells upon challenge with parasites and parasite antigens promoting an inflammatory response, and chymase mcp1 and mcp2 are used for marker for mast cell degranulation in parasite infection such as Nematode, Trichuris muris  Chymases are also known to convert angiotensin I to angiotensin II and thus play a role in hypertension and atherosclerosis.

Because of its role in inflammation it has been investigated as a target in the treatment of asthma.

References 

EC 3.4.21